Faraway Farm, also known as the Daniel Ropp House, is a historic home located near Martinsburg, Berkeley County, West Virginia. It was built about 1865 and is a two-story, "L"-shaped brick dwelling.  It is five bays wide and the ell is four bays long with a two-story recessed porch.  The entrance features a one bay, one story pedimented portico with plain balusters and column shafts with chamfered edges, known as a "West Virginia Porch."

It was listed on the National Register of Historic Places in 1980.

References

Houses on the National Register of Historic Places in West Virginia
Houses completed in 1865
Houses in Berkeley County, West Virginia
National Register of Historic Places in Berkeley County, West Virginia